McClover is a surname. Notable people with the surname include:

Darrell McClover (born 1981), American football player
Stanley McClover (born 1984), American football player